Jeff Wood may refer to:

 Jeff Wood (footballer) (born 1954), English former football goalkeeper
 Jeff Wood (racing driver) (born 1957), former race car driver
 Jeff Wood (singer) (born 1968), country music artist
 Jefferson Wood (born 1973), American Illustrator
 Jeffery Lee Wood (born 1973), prisoner on Texas death row
 Jeffery Wood (born 1986), American actor
 Jeffrey Wood (born 1969), politician